Rutherford is an unincorporated community in Fairfax County, Virginia, United States.
It lies South of Virginia State Highway 236 (a.k.a. Little River Turnpike), North of Virginia State Route 620 (Fairfax and Loudoun Counties) (a.k.a. Braddock Road), East of Olley Lane, and West of Guinea Road.  This is west of Annandale, east of the independent city of Fairfax.

Rutherford Park, Rutherford Area Swim Club and Fairfax County Public Schools Little Run Elementary School are located in the community.  Other parks are located nearby, including Long Branch Stream Valley Park to the south, Daniels Run Park to the west and Woodburn Road Park and Accotink Stream Valley Park to the northeast.

The Rutherford community consists of approximately 700 homes.

Notable landmarks
To the east lies Northern Virginia Community College Annandale Campus. To the northwest is Wilbert Tucker Woodson High School and Robert Frost Middle School.
Churches of note include St Matthews United Methodist Church, Highview Christian Fellowship, Providence Presbyterian Church, Barcroft Bible Church, Fairfax Seventh-day Adventist Church and Bethlehem Lutheran Church. The Jewish Community Centre of Northern Virginia also lies to the north.

References

Unincorporated communities in Fairfax County, Virginia
Unincorporated communities in Virginia
Washington metropolitan area